Dai Trang Le (born 1 April 1968) is an Australian politician currently serving as the federal member for Fowler, deputy mayor of Fairfield and councillor for Fairfield/Cabravale Ward.

Le arrived in Australia in 1979 as a refugee of the Vietnam War after fleeing Saigon in April 1975 and spending four years with her family in refugee camps in the Philippines and Hong Kong. She became an ABC journalist and politician, and was named as one of the 100 most influential Australian women in 2014.

In 2012 she was elected as a councillor for the City of Fairfield in New South Wales. At the 2022 Australian federal election, she successfully ran as an independent candidate in the Division of Fowler in Western Sydney. Le is the first refugee and Vietnamese Australian to be elected to the Australian House of Representatives.

Early life 

Le was born in Saigon in 1968, the former capital of South Vietnam. Her family was "closely linked with the Americans" during the Vietnam War. On 30 April 1975, the day that North Vietnam captured Saigon, Le was taken to a port with her family by "military dressed men" and put on a boat to the Philippines. Her family initially believed they would be resettled in the United States and were told their father would join themhe was a Vietnamese lawyer working with the American Embassyhowever he did not make it in time to board the boat. Subsequently, Le and her family never saw him again.

She lived in a refugee camp in the Philippines for three years until 1979, when her mother decided to smuggle the family aboard another boat to Hong Kong. Her family lived in a refugee camp in Hong Kong for nine months until they were processed by the United Nations High Commissioner for Refugees and accepted for resettlement to Australia. She arrived in Australia by plane in December 1979. Her family lived briefly in the Fairy Meadow Migrant Hostel after arriving before eventually being resettled in Bossley Park, a suburb in Sydney's west.

Le attended St Mary Star of the Sea College in Wollongong and later Cerdon College in Merrylands where she completed her Higher School Certificate. She then completed a Bachelor of Arts at Macquarie University, majoring in political science.

Journalism career 

Le began her career in 1990 as a cadet journalist at the Liverpool City Champion newspaper, and later helped establish the Fairfield City Champion newspaper with both being part of the Fairfax Community Media Network (now Australian Community Media).

In 1996, Le was one of 15 Australians awarded with the Vincent Fairfax Ethics and Leadership Fellowship Program. The 1996–1997 program allowed Le to travel across Australia and within the Asia/Pacific region to meet and engage with different levels of government, leaders and community groups.

Le also worked for the Australian Broadcasting Corporation between 1994 and 2008 in a number of roles across TV and radio for programs such as Four Corners, Foreign Correspondent, Lateline, AM, PM, The World Today, and as a producer of Saturday Extra with Geraldine Doogue.

Political career 

Le entered the political scene in 2008 as the Liberal Party candidate for the New South Wales state electoral district of Cabramatta in the 2008 by-election following the resignation of sitting MP and former NSW Health Minister Reba Meagher. During this campaign, Le achieved a 20.18-point swing against Labor but was unsuccessful in winning the seat.

At the 2011 NSW state election, Le stood again as the Liberal Party candidate for Cabramatta achieving a further 5-point swing to the Liberal Party turning the once safe Labor seat into a marginal seat. Le again was unsuccessful, losing the seat by 1,768 votes after preferences, reducing the overall margin for the seat to 2 points.

In 2012, Le was elected as an independent candidate to Fairfield City Council's Cabravale Ward in the NSW Local Government Election. She represented Cabravale Ward between 2012 and 2021 before changes to ward boundaries led her to contest the newly created Fairfield/Cabravale Ward since the 2021 NSW local government election.

In 2016, her bid to become mayor over the endorsed Liberal candidate resulted in her suspension from the Liberal party for 10 years. She subsequently teamed up with mayor Frank Carbone, who resigned from the Labor Party, to lead a majority-independent council as of December 2021. 

Le stood as an independent candidate for the seat of Fowler at the 2022 Australian federal election, in response to Labor candidate Kristina Keneally being parachuted into the seat. Le won the seat, with an 18-point swing against the Australian Labor Party, who had previously held it since its creation in 1984. After her election win they had some questions over her eligibility to stand, due to questions on her foreign citizenship status. She dismissed these questions.

In early August 2022 as one of her first duties in Parliament Le abstained from the Climate Change Bill, tweeting:

"I will be abstaining from voting on the Climate Change Bill. I can’t justify voting yes on a bill that’s been rushed through parliament when we haven’t been given any specific details of the immediate impact on communities like Fowler. I support a cleaner and greener environment, but my main priority is making sure the high cost of living and unemployment rates in our area are stabilised – especially in these very tough economic times. I will consider supporting future climate policies only if they have a positive outcome for low-income families who are already struggling with high food, fuel and energy prices."

Personal life 
Le is married to Markus Lambert and has one son.

In August 2012, Le was appointed to the Advisory Board of Multicultural NSW (formerly the NSW Community Relations Commission) providing advice to Government ministers and agencies.

In October 2014, Le discovered she had breast cancer and undertook intensive chemotherapy and radiation treatment. She later recovered from her breast cancer in 2015 and was appointed a Cancer Council ambassador for Greater Western Sydney.

Le is also the founder of the Diverse Australian Women's Network, which aims to empower women from diverse backgrounds through conversation and advocacy. She also founded the South West Entrepreneurial Hub, a platform for business owners, start-ups and entrepreneurs living in Sydney’s South West, to meet, collaborate and share their experiences and learn from one another.

Le stated, “She still believes in God and prays to the Virgin Mary” but is no longer a practising Catholic. She credits her election win to the intercession of the Blessed Virgin Mary.

Although her surname (Lê) is pronounced  in the Saigon dialect ("lay"), she has taken to use the pronunciation  ("lee") which the Australian public generally uses.

References

External links
Diverse Australian Women's Network

|-

1968 births
21st-century Australian women politicians
Australian politicians of Vietnamese descent
Deputy mayors of places in Australia
Independent members of the Parliament of Australia
Living people
Macquarie University alumni
Naturalised citizens of Australia
New South Wales local councillors
People from Ho Chi Minh City
Vietnamese emigrants to Australia
Vietnamese refugees
Members of the Australian House of Representatives
Members of the Australian House of Representatives for Fowler
Women members of the Australian House of Representatives
21st-century Australian politicians